Yury Smolyakov (born 20 September 1941) is a Soviet fencer. He won a silver medal in the team épée event at the 1968 Summer Olympics.

References

1941 births
Living people
Russian male fencers
Soviet male fencers
Olympic fencers of the Soviet Union
Fencers at the 1964 Summer Olympics
Fencers at the 1968 Summer Olympics
Olympic silver medalists for the Soviet Union
Olympic medalists in fencing
Sportspeople from Voronezh
Medalists at the 1968 Summer Olympics